Arthur Leo McSpeerin (26 February 1880 – 1 May 1935) was an Australian rules footballer who played for the Carlton Football Club and Melbourne Football Club in the Victorian Football League (VFL).
		
He also played District cricket for Collingwood and enlisted to serve in World War I but the war ended before he saw active duty.

He died in Wellington, New Zealand after an accident with a fire engine.

Notes

External links 

Artie McSpeerin's profile at Blueseum

1880 births
Australian rules footballers from Victoria (Australia)
Carlton Football Club players
Melbourne Football Club players
1935 deaths
Road incident deaths in New Zealand
Australian military personnel of World War I